Chester Cruze (born c. 1939) is a former member of the Ohio House of Representatives.

References

Members of the Ohio House of Representatives
1930s births
Living people